VEKA AG is a German extruder of uPVC profiles for use in windows and doors headquartered in Sendenhorst, Germany. Founded in 1967 as a manufacturer of shutters, it currently operates its own extrusion facilities in twelve countries. It also operates representative offices in more than forty countries, including the United Arab Emirates and India.

History

VEKA was founded in 1967 in Sendenhorst, West Germany, as Vekaplast, initially only producing roller shutters. Two years later, Heinrich Laumann, one of the company's eight employees at the time, purchased the company. In 1970, VEKA began work on designing their own window profile, which they released in 1971. In 1974, VEKA began producing front doors and sliding door systems. Having outgrown their rented 15,000 square foot factory, the company purchased 115,000 square meters of land at an industrial site in Sendenhorst to build a new extrusion factory. In 1977, the first 10,500 square meters of the company's new factory was completed. Extensions to the factory were added onto it in 1979 and 1980, tripling its size to 31,500 square meters. In 1981, VEKA opened its first mixing plant in Sendenhorst.

In 1983, due to economic stagnation in West Germany, VEKA decided to increase its exports to foreign markets, establishing subsidiaries in Spain, France, and the United States within a year. In 1985, the company began manufacturing PVC sheets.
In 1986, VEKA established a subsidiary in the United Kingdom, which quickly began production for the British market. It also acquired the Belgian PVC and PE foil producers Isoblec, Azotherm, and ACE. The factory in Sendenhorst was expanded with a powerful mixing plant and a production hall for more sheet extruders.

In 1990, VEKA incorporated under the name of VEKA GmbH. The next year, the company established a waste management subsidiary called VEKA Umwelttechnik GmbH in Behringen, Germany. In 1992, VEKA GmbH became a public limited company, with the Laumann family keeping their control over the company. In 1993, VEKA opened a 120,000 square meter recycling center. They also established the subsidiary VEKA West, Inc. in Reno, Nevada to serve the Western United States. VEKA Holdings Inc. was also created to manage VEKA's operations in the United States. Between 1994 and 1999, VEKA established subsidiaries in Poland, Russia, Argentina, and Singapore.

In 1999, VEKA celebrated their 30th anniversary, with 2,200 guests from 37 countries attending. Heinrich Laumann received honorary citizenship from the city of Sendenhorst and was decorated by the Federal Republic of Germany for his entrepreneurial performance. In 2000, Heinrich Laumann stepped down from the Board of Directors and became the chairman of the Supervisory Board. Hubert Hecker was named the new chairman of the Board of Directors. That year, VEKA established subsidiaries in Romania, Mexico, and Brazil.

In 2002, VEKA Holdings Inc. acquired the Canadian extruder Berlinex, renaming it to VEKA Canada Holdings Comp. Between 2003 and 2006, subsidiaries were established in India, Malaysia, and Ukraine. In 2006, VEKA established VEKA South in Terrell, Texas to serve the Southern United States, Central America, and the Caribbean.

References

External links
Official site
Official UK site
Official USA site

Companies based in North Rhine-Westphalia
Manufacturing companies of Germany
German brands